German submarine U-60 was a Type IIC U-boat of Nazi Germany's Kriegsmarine that served in the Second World War. She was built by Deutsche Werke AG, Kiel. Ordered on 21 July 1937, she was laid down on 1 October that year as yard number 259. She was launched on 1 June 1939 and commissioned on 22 July under the command of Oberleutnant zur See Georg Schewe.

U-60 was initially sent to the 5th U-boat Flotilla for training, until 1 October 1939, when she was reassigned to the 1st flotilla for a front-line combat role. She then became a 'school' or training boat with the 21st flotilla for the rest of her career.

She was scuttled on 5 May 1945 at Wilhelmshaven.

Design
German Type IIC submarines were enlarged versions of the original Type IIs. U-60 had a displacement of  when at the surface and  while submerged. She had two shafts and two  propellers.

U-60 was fitted with three  torpedo tubes at the bow, five torpedoes or up to twelve Type A torpedo mines, and a  anti-aircraft gun. The boat had a complement of 25.

Service history

First, second and third patrols
U-60s first patrol meant that she left and returned to Kiel in November 1939, it involved the boat keeping close to the Norwegian coast.

She moved from Kiel to Wilhelmshaven on 4 December 1939.

The boat began her second patrol on 12 December 1939 and laid mines off Great Yarmouth on the 15th. One of them was struck by the City of Kobe on the 19th. The ship sank, one crew member was lost.

The submarine's third sortie involved patrolling the southern North Sea. It was uneventful.

fourth, fifth and sixth patrols
U-60s next three outings took her as far north as the eastern Scottish coast, as far east as the Norwegian coast and as far south as Belgium in the North Sea, all to no avail.

Seventh, eighth and ninth patrols
Nor did her run of bad luck end there. On 1 August 1940 she was attacked by the Dutch submarine O 21. That same day Junkers Ju 88s of KG 30 also attacked the boat. No damage from either assault was sustained. After the patrol, she docked at Lorient in occupied France, on 18 August.

The ship survived a hit from a torpedo, but while she was being docked prior to repairs being carried out, a second, unexploded torpedo was discovered lodged in the vessel's hull.

U-60 departed her French Atlantic base (Lorient) on 16 September 1940, heading for Bergen in Norway. Her route took her west of Ireland and through the gap between the Faroe and the Shetland Islands. The boat arrived in the Nordic port on 2 October.

She then moved from Bergen back to Kiel over October.

Summary of raiding History

References

Bibliography

External links
 

German Type II submarines
U-boats commissioned in 1939
World War II submarines of Germany
1939 ships
Ships built in Kiel
Operation Regenbogen (U-boat)
Maritime incidents in May 1945